Sundanese numerals (Sundanese language: Wilangan) is a number system used by Sundanese people and contains a sequence of 10 digits in Sundanese script. The Wilangan writing system is the same as in Arabic numerals, i.e. the writing is directed to the right, only there is a difference in terms of marking, namely that the writing of numbers in Sundanese script must use a pipe sign ( | ), because some forms of Sundanese numerals are similar to consonant letters ( ngalagéna), it is feared that ambiguity will occur. 

Example: |20x20px|pra=20x20px|pra=| = 2020

However, because the writing system that is more often used in Sundanese is the Latin alphabet, it is more common to write numbers in Sundanese using Arabic numerals and the use of numbers in Sundanese script is optional.

Basic numbering in Sundanese 
Some numbers in Sundanese have more than one different way of pronouncing the number, for example in the tweens, the way of pronouncing the numbers 21–29 can also use lilikuran.

Examples of Writing and Mentioning:

Hundreds 

 100 – || – saratus
 175 – || – saratus tujuh puluh lima/lebak satak
 200 – || – dua ratus
 300 – || – tilu ratus
 375 – || – tilu ratus tujuh puluh lima/lebak samas
 400 – || – opat ratus, samas
 500 – || – lima ratus
 600 – || – genep ratus
 705 – || – tujuh ratus lima
 800 – || – dalapan ratus/domas
 820 – || – dalapan ratus dua puluh
 999 – || – salapan ratus salapan puluh salapan

Thousands 

 1.000 – || – sarébu
 2.000 – || – dua rébu
 3.007 – || – tilu rébu tujuh
 4.010 – || – opat rébu sapuluh
 5.500 – || – lima rébu lima ratus
 6.708 – || – genep rébu tujuh ratus dalapan
 7.880 – || – tujuh rébu dalapan ratus dalapan puluh
 9.999 – || – salapan rébu salapan ratus salapan puluh salapan

Tens of thousands 

 10.000 – || – sapuluh rébu/salaksa
 15.000 – || – lima belas rébu/limalas rébu
 25.000 – || – dua puluh lima rébu/salawé rébu
 50.000 – || – lima puluh rébu
 99.999 – || – salapan puluh salapan rébu salapan ratus salapan puluh salapan

Hundreds of thousands 

 100.000 – || – saratus rébu/saketi
 500.000 – || – lima ratus rébu
 725.160 – || – tujuh ratus dua puluh lima rébu saratus genep puluh
 999.999 – || – salapan ratus salapan puluh salapan rébu salapan ratus salapan puluh salapan

Millions 

 1.000.000 – || – sayuta/sapuluh keti
 5.000.000 – || – lima yuta
 6.486.417 – || – genep yuta opat ratus dalapan puluh genep rébu opat ratus tujuh belas
 9.999.999 – || – salapan juta salapan ratus salapan puluh salapan rébu salapan ratus salapan puluh salapan

References

Bibliography

External links 

 How to say Numbers in Sundanese – Tutorial
 Kamus Bahasa Sunda 
 Konverter Huruf Latin – Aksara Sunda
 Sundanese-Indonesian Translator
 (47,7M) Kamus Sunda-Indonesia – Pusat Pembinaan dan Pengembangan Bahasa Depdikbud

Sundanese language
Numerals